"A Little Bit of Your Love" is a song recorded by Canadian country music artist Joel Feeney. It was released in 1998 as the first single from his third studio album, Joel Feeney. It peaked at number 12 on the RPM Country Tracks chart in November 1998.

Chart performance

Year-end charts

References

1998 songs
1998 singles
Joel Feeney songs
MCA Records singles
Songs written by Joel Feeney
Songs written by Chris Farren (country musician)
Song recordings produced by Chris Farren (country musician)